The Government of Odisha in India has come up with various programs called schemes (yojana) from time to time for the people of the State. This is a list of some of the major ones. State implementations of national schemes (e.g. National Nutrition Mission (Ministry of Women and Child Development); The Prohibition of Child Marriage Act, 2006; Integrated Child Development Services) are not included.

Current schemes of odisha govt. 
 kalia jojana -2019

See also
 List of central government schemes in India

References

 
Odisha schemes
Schemes
Schemes